Pyli ( meaning "gate", before 1927: Δερβενοσάλεσι - Dervenosalesi) is a village and a community in Boeotia, Greece.  Its population in 2011 was 652 for the village and 745 for the community, which includes the villages Lefka, Panakto and Prasino. It was the seat of the former municipality of Dervenochoria. The site of the ancient Attic fortress of Panactum is between the villages of Panakto and Prasino (formerly Kavasala).

Population

Geography

Pyli is situated at the eastern edge of the Pastra mountain. It is in a sparsely populated area, dominated by agriculture and forestry. It is 5 km west of Skourta, 19 km north of Elefsina and 20 km southeast of Thebes. The Zoodochos Pigi Church, remnant of a medieval monastery, lies 5 km to the west.

See also
List of settlements in Boeotia

External links
 Pyli on GTP Travel Pages

References

Dervenochoria
Populated places in Boeotia